Beast Mode is the ninth studio album by American rapper Juvenile. The album was released on July 6, 2010, by UTP Records and E1 Entertainment. Producers on the album include S-8ighty, C. Smith, Sinista, Streets, Raj Smoov, and Niyo.

Background 
The album is the rapper's follow up to his album Cocky & Confident, which was released in 2009. Juvenile said that he did not expect to include many featured guests on the album, but he does plan to recruit artists for the remix versions of his singles.

Singles 
The first single is "Drop That Azz", which was produced by C. Smith. It was released on iTunes on May 18, 2010. A music video for the single was released on June 11, 2010.

Track listing

Charts

References 

2010 albums
Juvenile (rapper) albums